Donald Edward Parish (January 4, 1948 – May 9, 2018) was an American football linebacker.  Parish played at Stanford, where he was the Pop Warner Trophy winner in 1969.  He was chosen in the fourth round of the 1970 NFL Draft by the St. Louis Cardinals.  Parish played three seasons for the Cardinals, Los Angeles Rams, and Denver Broncos.

He had three brothers, Kenneth, Cecil and Don.

The St. Louis Quarterback Club selected Parish as the Cardinals' team Rookie of the Year in December 1970.

As a member of the Cardinal, Parish set the school record for single-game tackles against Oregon State in 1968, making 23 stops, a mark he would hold for 18 years until Dave Wyman surpassed it. As a senior, he was selected for first-team All-America honors by the AP, The Sporting News and Time.

In 1971, then-Stanford coach John Ralston called Parish "the finest linebacker" he had ever coached, adding: "In his three seasons (at Stanford), he has never given anything less than 110-percent effort."

He suffered from traumatic brain injury during his football days, his brother, Kenneth, told a reporter in 2021. Unhoused in Los Angeles for many years, Parish died at age 70 on May 9, 2018, in Paso Robles, California.

In June 2022, his alma mater, PRHS, named its football field in honor of Parish.

References

External links

 Don Parish cemetery marker

1948 births
2018 deaths
American football linebackers
St. Louis Cardinals (football) players
Los Angeles Rams players
Denver Broncos players
Stanford Cardinal football players
People from Paso Robles, California
Players of American football from California